Carmack is a surname derived from the Irish given name "Cormac". Notable people with the surname include:

Adrian Carmack (born 1969), game artist, cofounder of id Software
Chris Carmack (born 1980), American actor
Edward W. Carmack (1858–1908), American politician
George Carmack (1860–1922), American discoverer of gold in the Klondike region
Howard Carmack, Internet spammer
John Carmack (born 1970), American game programmer, co-founder of id Software
Justin Carmack (1981-2000), American child actor
Kate Carmack (1862–1920), First Nation woman
Kona Carmack (born 1976), American model

See also
Carmack Amendment to the Interstate Commerce Act regarding the liability of carriers under receipts and bills of lading 
Carmacks, Yukon
Carmacks Group
Carmacks Airport
Carmack's Reverse, computer graphics technique
Little Salmon/Carmacks First Nation
 Cormack (surname)
 McCormack
 McCormick (surname)